Gabiley, also known as Gebiley, is a city in the  Maroodi Jeex region of Somaliland.

Gabiley is located 58 km west of Hargeisa, the capital of Somaliland. It is in the center of the Gabiley district, bounded on the north by the Gulf of Aden, on the west by the Awdal region, on the east by the Hargeisa district, and on the south by the Somali Region of Ethiopia.

History
Gabiley is one of the oldest towns in Somaliland after Zeila, Berbera and Amud. Some stones left behind in the area were believed to have been earmarked for the construction of pyramids.

Demographics
The town of Gabiley has a population of around 106,914.

The Gabiley District in which the city is situated is exclusively dominated by people from the Somali ethnic group, with the Jibril Abokor sub divisions of the Sa'ad Musa subclan of the Habar Awal Isaaq the main residents of this district.

Education
Primary schools, Secondary schools and University education is available throughout the district. The smaller communities have their own primary schools. For post-secondary education, Timacade University was opened in 1999 to serve the needs of the town's students. The education system in Gabiley region is growing in a faster pace than most of Somaliland.

Healthcare
Gabiley has 6 operating general hospital. One massive hospital opened in 2010, it provides medical services to the larger region.

In 2016 the municipal government was led by Mahamed-Amiin Omer Abdi who is the current mayor of Gabiley city and the governor of Gabiley region.

Agriculture

Gabiley is the main farm land for Somaliland and produces up to 85% of Somaliland's food supplies. It is known for its agricultural and farming industry, and is where most of Somaliland's crops are produced. Crops grown in the area include apples, oranges, bananas, corn, pears, maize, wheat, barley, beans, lemon, peas, groundnuts, potatoes, tomatoes, onions, garlic, salad and cabbages, broccoli, watermelon, papaya and many other types of fruits and vegetables. Gabiley is considered to be the most fertile region in Somaliland.

Climate
According to Köppen-Geiger system, Gabiley has a hot semi-arid climate (BSh), although it is moderated by altitude.

Notable residents
 Abdillahi Suldaan Mohammed Timacade, prominent Somali poet during the pre- and post-colonial period from Galooley who conducted public readings in the area. He belongs to the Ali Jibril (Reer Hareed) sub-clan of the Jibril Abokor clan.
 Mohamed Hasan Abdullahi, former Chief of Staff of Somaliland Armed Forces and SNM General. He belongs to the Ali Jibril (Reer Dalal) sub-clan of the Jibril Abokor clan.
 Mo Farah, British four-time Olympic gold medalist and the most decorated athlete in British athletics history; belongs to the Muhammed Jibril (Deriyahan) sub-clan of the Jibril Abokor clan. 
 Nuh Ismail Tani, current Chief of Staff of Somaliland Armed Forces. He belongs to the Ali Jibril (Reer Hareed) of the Jibril Abokor clan.
 John Drysdale, also known as Abbas Idriss, a British-born army officer, diplomat, writer, historian, publisher, and businessman who spent the last years of his life in the city. Most notably, due to his expertise on Somali history and culture, he served as an advisor to UNOSOM II and advocated for a diplomatic resolution to the war raging between UNOSOM II and Mohammed Farah Aidid in 1993. He was also the first ever Caucasian to vote in Somaliland elections.

References

External links
 Gabiley news (Somali)
 Gabiley - coordinates

Populated places in Maroodi Jeex